Brecon Free Street railway station served Brecon, in the historic Welsh county of Brecknockshire, now Powys.

The Brecon and Merthyr Railway obtained an Act of Parliament on 1 August 1859 to construct a line between Talybont and Pant. Train services between Brecon and Pant officially began on 23 April 1863 but two trains per day ran from 19 March 1863 from its first station in Watton.  The Neath and Brecon Railway had a temporary station at Brecon Mount Street by 1868, but a joint station was opened at Free Street in 1871 replacing the two separate stations.

The line and station finally closed in 1964.

History
The Brecon and Merthyr Tydfil Junction Railway became part of the Great Western Railway during the Grouping of 1923.

A special train ran to Free Street on 2 May 1964 named the Last Train to Brecon.

The line closed to passengers on 31 December 1962 and to goods on 4 May 1964.

The site today
Heol Gouesnou approximately follows the course of the railway from The Struet to the site of Brecon Free Street station (near the bus station).

References

External links
http://history.powys.org.uk/school1/brecon/stations.shtml

Disused railway stations in Powys
Former Brecon and Merthyr Tydfil Junction Railway stations
Railway stations in Great Britain opened in 1871
Railway stations in Great Britain closed in 1962